WOW Christmas: Green is the second release in the WOW Christmas series. It is the follow-up to the platinum-selling WOW Christmas: Red album. The double-disc album features 15 new tracks that are (so far) exclusive to this release. The album peaked at #54 on the Billboard 200 chart in 2005, and at #2 on the Top Christian Albums chart.  WOW Christmas: Green was certified gold in 2006 by the Recording Industry Association of America (RIAA).

Track listing

Disc 1 
Amy Grant - A Christmas to Remember – 4:20
Natalie Grant - Joy to the World – 4:30
Rebecca St. James - Hark the Herald Angels Sing – 4:22
Steven Curtis Chapman - O Little Town of Bethlehem – 4:57
tobyMac - O Come All Ye Faithful – 3:08
ZOEgirl - What Child Is This? – 4:46
NewSong - The Christmas Shoes – 4:51
Jaci Velasquez - I'll Be Home for Christmas – 4:07
Chris Tomlin - Angels We Have Heard on High – 4:10
Jars of Clay - Little Drummer Boy – 4:20
Casting Crowns - Away in a Manger – 3:36
Third Day - O Come, O Come Emmanuel – 4:45
BarlowGirl - O Holy Night – 4:33
Avalon - Don't Save It All for Christmas Day – 4:45
CeCe Winans - We Wish You a Merry Christmas – 4:26

Disc 2 
Joy Williams - Have Yourself a Merry Little Christmas – 3:18
Bethany Dillon - God Rest Ye Merry Gentlemen – 3:33
Michael W. Smith - Welcome to Our World – 3:28
Matthew West - Let It Snow, Let It Snow, Let It Snow – 2:19
Clay Aiken - Mary Did You Know? – 3:18
Point of Grace - Jingle Bell Rock – 3:06
Building 429 - We Three Kings – 4:52
Kutless - It Came Upon a Midnight Clear – 3:36
Relient K - Deck the Halls – 1:20
Big Daddy Weave - Go Tell It on the Mountain – 3:52
Selah - Silent Night – 4:20
David Crowder Band - Feliz Navidad – 2:36
Mark Schultz - The First Noel – 4:54
FFH - Do You Hear What I Hear? – 4:09
Jump5 - Sleigh Ride – 3:12
(* bold denotes track exclusive to this release)

Notes 
 The Relient K song "Deck the Halls", although listed as "exclusive" is in fact not. It was available on the Deck the Halls, Bruise Your Hand EP that came packaged with Two Lefts Don't Make a Right...but Three Do and is also available on the CD Let It Snow, Baby... Let It Reindeer and also available separately on digital download services.
 Digital singles of the songs by Bethany, Big Daddy Weave, Building 429, Chris Tomlin, David Crowder Band, Rebecca St. James, and ZOEgirl were released after the release of this album, prior to Christmas 2005.
 The first WOW CD to feature a Clay Aiken song.

Awards
In 2006, the album was nominated for a Dove Award for Special Event Album of the Year at the 37th GMA Dove Awards.

References

2005 Christmas albums
Christmas compilation albums
2005 compilation albums
WOW series albums